Saint Francis Academy may refer to:

 Saint Francis Academy (Gainesville, Florida), a secondary school in the U.S.
 St. Francis Academy (Joliet, Illinois), a former all-girls secondary school in the U.S.
 St. Francis Academy (San Antonio), a former all-girls secondary school in Texas, U.S.
 St. Francis Academy (Balamban, Cebu), a Catholic college in the Philippines
 Saint Francis Academy, a private school in Dasmariñas, Philippines 
 Academy of Saint Francis of Assisi, a co-ed secondary school in Liverpool, England, U.K.

See also
 Franciscan Montessori Earth School & Saint Francis Academy, an elementary and middle school in Oregon, U.S.
 St. Frances Academy (Baltimore, Maryland), a co-ed secondary school in the U.S.
 University of Saint Francis (disambiguation)